Șieu may refer to several places:

 Șieu, Bistrița-Năsăud, a commune in Bistrița-Năsăud County
 Șieu, Maramureș, a commune in Maramureș County
 Șieu-Măgheruș, a commune in Bistrița-Năsăud County
 Șieu-Odorhei, a commune in Bistrița-Năsăud County and its village of Cristur-Șieu
 Șieu-Sfântu, a village in Șintereag Commune, Bistrița-Năsăud County
 Șieu (river), in Bistrița-Năsăud County, Romania